The 1992 European Karate Championships were held in Den Bosch, Netherlands from May 5 to 7, 1992. It was the 27th year of the event.

Competition

Team

Women's Competition

Individual

Team

Medal table

References

External links
Karate Records - European Championship 1992

1992
International sports competitions hosted by the Netherlands
European Karate Championships
European championships in 1992
Karate competitions in the Netherlands
Sports competitions in 's-Hertogenbosch